Ryszard Nowak (born 12 September 1962 in Nowy Sącz) is a Polish politician, member of Law and Justice party. He was elected to the Sejm on 25 September 2005. He was the president of the Nowy Sącz from 2006 to 2018.

References

1962 births
Living people
People from Nowy Sącz
Law and Justice politicians
21st-century Polish politicians